Richard B. Bates (August 17, 1843 – 1910) was a member of the Wisconsin State Assembly.

Biography 
Bates was born on August 17, 1843 in what was then West Troy, New York. He died in 1910.

Career 
Bates was elected to the Wisconsin State Assembly in 1871. He was a Democrat.

References 

People from Watervliet, New York
People from Walworth County, Wisconsin
Politicians from Milwaukee
Politicians from Racine, Wisconsin
1843 births
1910 deaths
19th-century American politicians
Democratic Party members of the Wisconsin State Assembly